Attheya gaussii is a species of diatoms in the genus Attheya.

References

External links
INA

Protists described in 2000
Ochrophyte species
Coscinodiscophyceae